Chained may refer to:

 Chained (1934 film), starring Joan Crawford and Clark Gable
 Chained (2012 film), a Canadian film directed by Jennifer Lynch
 Chained (2020 film), a Canadian film directed by Titus Heckel
 Chained, a 2008 album by Crystal Eyes
 "Chained" (Marvin Gaye song), 1968
 "Chained", a 1974 song by Rare Earth
 "Chained" (The xx song), 2012

See also
 Chain (disambiguation)